The word energy derives from Greek , which appears for the first time in the 4th century BCE works of Aristotle (OUP V, 240, 1991) (including Physics, Metaphysics, Nicomachean Ethics and De Anima).

The modern concept of energy emerged from the idea of vis viva (living force), which Leibniz defined as the product of the mass of an object and its velocity squared, he believed that total vis viva was conserved. To account for slowing due to friction, Leibniz claimed that heat consisted of the random motion of the constituent parts of matter — a view described by Bacon in Novum Organon to illustrate inductive reasoning and shared by Isaac Newton, although it would be more than a century until this was generally accepted.

Émilie marquise du Châtelet in her book Institutions de Physique ("Lessons in Physics"), published in 1740, incorporated the idea of Leibniz with practical observations of Gravesande to show that the "quantity of motion" of a moving object is proportional to its mass and its velocity squared (not the velocity itself as Newton taught—what was later called momentum).

In 1802 lectures to the Royal Society, Thomas Young was the first to use the term energy in its modern sense, instead of vis viva. In the 1807 publication of those lectures, he wrote,

Gustave-Gaspard Coriolis described "kinetic energy" in 1829 in its modern sense, and in 1853, William Rankine coined the term "potential energy."

It was argued for some years whether energy was a substance (the caloric) or merely a physical quantity.

Thermodynamics

The development of steam engines  required engineers to develop concepts and formulas that would allow them to describe the mechanical and thermal efficiencies of their systems. Engineers such as Sadi Carnot, physicists such as James Prescott Joule, mathematicians such as Émile Clapeyron and Hermann von Helmholtz, and amateurs such as Julius Robert von Mayer all contributed to the notion that the ability to perform certain tasks, called work, was somehow related to the amount of energy in the system. In the 1850s, Glasgow professor of natural philosophy William Thomson and his ally in the engineering science William Rankine began to replace the older language of mechanics with terms such as actual energy, kinetic energy, and potential energy.  William Thomson (Lord Kelvin) amalgamated all of these laws into the laws of thermodynamics, which aided in the rapid development of explanations of chemical processes using the concept of energy by Rudolf Clausius, Josiah Willard Gibbs and Walther Nernst. It also led to a mathematical formulation of the concept of entropy by Clausius, and to the introduction of laws of radiant energy by Jožef Stefan.
Rankine coined the term potential energy.  In 1881, William Thomson stated before an audience that:

Over the following thirty years or so this newly developing science went by various names, such as the dynamical theory of heat or energetics, but after the 1920s generally came to be known as thermodynamics, the science of energy transformations.

Stemming from the 1850s development of the first two laws of thermodynamics, the science of energy have since branched off into a number of various fields, such as biological thermodynamics and thermoeconomics, to name a couple; as well as related terms such as entropy, a measure of the loss of useful energy, or power, an energy flow per unit time, etc. In the past two centuries, the use of the word energy in various "non-scientific" vocations, e.g. social studies, spirituality and psychology has proliferated the popular literature.

Conservation of energy
In 1918 it was proved that the law of conservation of energy is the direct mathematical consequence of the translational symmetry of the quantity conjugate to energy, namely time.  That is, energy is conserved because the laws of physics do not distinguish between different moments of time (see Noether's theorem).

During a 1961 lecture for undergraduate students at the California Institute of Technology, Richard Feynman, a celebrated physics teacher and Nobel Laureate, said this about the concept of energy:

See also
 Timeline of thermodynamics
 History of physics
 History of the conservation of energy principle
 History of thermodynamics
 A Guide to the Scientific Knowledge of Things Familiar, a book by Ebenezer Cobham Brewer, published around 1840, presenting explanations for common phenomena
 Caloric theory

References

Further reading
 Hecht, Eugene. "An Historico-Critical Account of Potential Energy: Is PE Really Real?" The Physics Teacher 41 (Nov 2003): 486–93.
 Hughes, Thomas. Networks of Power. Electrification in Western society, 1880-1930 (Johns Hopkins UP, 1983).
 Martinás,  Katalin. "Aristotelian Thermodynamics," Thermodynamics: history and philosophy: facts, trends, debates (Veszprém, Hungary 23–28 July 1990), 285–303.
 Mendoza, E. "A sketch for a history of early thermodynamics." Physics Today 14.2 (1961): 32–42.
 Müller, Ingo. A history of thermodynamics (Berlin: Springer, 2007)

External links
  The Journal of Energy History / Revue d'histoire de l'énergie (JEHRHE) 
 Timeline of history of energy for children

 
Energy